Pulong Buhangin National High School (Filipino: Pambansang Mataas na Paaralan ng Pulong Buhangin) or PBNHS is a government secondary education institution located at Pulong Buhangin, Santa Maria town, Bulacan province, Philippines. Noted for its intensive teaching program, the School is one of the notable high schools in the province, and excels in the disciplines of Mathematics, Science, Home Economics, English, Filipino and Basic Journalism. The School changed its name from Pulong Buhangin High School in 2003. The school is within the EDDIS-IV of Bulacan.

Administration 
Mrs. Ederlinda P. dela Cruz, current high school principal
Mr. Bonifacio Domingo, current school Officer-in-Charge

Publication 
Mr. Rosauro Castillo, The Echoes
Mrs. Mharikith Fababier, Emma Guitaba, Ang Alingawngaw

Library and Research Center 
Mrs. Sylvia Roxas

Food and Nutrition 
Mr. Tasyo Calibugan
Mrs. Ronalyn Pidlaoan

Chorale 
Ms. Carina H. Ignacio
Mr. Rosauro A. Castillo

Culture and the Arts 
Mr. Luisito T. Cruz

Guidance and Counselling

Achievements

National level
Won the National Brigada Eskwela in Davao City last 2005.
Francisco Bautista won the first place in editorial writing - Filipino in the S.Y. 2005-2006 National Schools Press Conference held at Kalibo, Aklan province, he also won first in radio broadcasting group contest and a special award in technical application in the said contest. He is the first from PBNHS to win a place in the NSPC.
Angelo Louise Jalandoni-Lopez won the first place in Copyreading and Headline Writing  National Schools Press Conference 2008 held at Koronodal City, South Cotabato. 
Charlie M. del Rosario won first place two times in NSPC 2011 and NSPC 2012
Rizzly Joyce Estacio placed 3rd at the S.Y. 2006-2007 (National) Pambansang Tagisan ng Talino sa Filipino held in Marikina.
Michelle Salinas won third in radio broadcasting group contest at the S.Y. 2006-2007 National Schools Press Conference held at Baguio, just a year after Francisco Bautista won a championship title in the same contest.
Joyce Ann Daganasol won the 7th best news presenter in the Radio Broadcasting special event in the S.Y. 2007-2008 National Schools Press Conference held at Koronadal City.

Official Publications 
Ang Alingawngaw
The Echoes

High schools in Bulacan
Education in Santa Maria, Bulacan